The 2019 Asian Fencing Championships was held in Chiba, Japan from 13 to 18 June 2019 at the Chiba Port Arena.

Medal summary

Men

Women

Medal table

Results

Men

Individual épée

Team épée

Individual foil

Team foil

Individual sabre

Team sabre

Women

Individual épée

Team épée

Individual foil

Team foil

Individual sabre

Team sabre

References

External links 
Official website 

Asian Fencing Championships
Asian Fencing Championships
International fencing competitions hosted by Japan
Asian Fencing Championships
Sport in Chiba (city)
Asian Fencing Championships